Vijilesh Karayad is an Indian actor works in malayalam cinema, known for his performances in Maheshinte Prathikaaram, Varathan, kothth and Krishnankutty Pani Thudangi.

Early life and career
Vijilesh grew up in Karayad in the Kozhikode district of Kerala and attended Sree Sankaracharya University of Sanskrit, Kalady, and he also studied in School of letters Mahatma Gandhi University, Kottayam where he received his Master of Philosophy degree in theatre studies. He married Swathi Haridas, a trained high school teacher in sociology. His first noteworthy role was in Dileesh Pothan’s Maheshinte Prathikaaram, as a timid man who learns kung fu to protect his sister from eve-teasers. He played a notable supporting role in the 2021 rape and revenge horror film Krishnankutty Pani Thudangi.

Filmography

References 

Male actors in Malayalam cinema
Indian male film actors
Living people
Year of birth missing (living people)